The Cornish Seal Sanctuary is a sanctuary for injured seal pups, and is owned by The SEA LIFE Trust.  The centre is on the banks of the Helford River in Cornwall, England, UK, next to the village of Gweek.

History
The origins of the seal sanctuary go back to 1958 when the founder, Ken Jones, discovered a baby seal washed up on the beach near his home at St Agnes. This was the first of many rescues. By 1975, the work had outgrown the single pool at St Agnes and a new site was found at Gweek. The Gweek site slowly grew, and today has five pools and a specially designed hospital.

Rescue work

On average the centre has between sixty and seventy seals pups in their care, and in 2018 over eighty have been rescued from the wild. Main reasons for a pup’s rescue can be because it is separated from their mothers and are unable to feed, or they can be entangled in marine litter. The aim is to release them back into the wild having given them the best chance of survival.

The rescue normally starts with a call about an apparently abandoned pup. If the rescue team decide that the pup is in danger, it is captured and taken to the sanctuary. Upon arrival, a full medical assessment is carried out, and a course of treatment is decided. Many of the pups are malnourished, with infected wounds. When the seal starts to recover and gain weight, it is transferred to a convalescence pool, where it interacts with convalescing and resident seals, and learns to compete for its food. After a few months, when the seal has reached a good weight and is back to full health, it is released into the sea, preferably near where it was originally discovered. Before release each seal is given a flipper tag, and recently also a hat tag which falls off at the first moult. These provide useful information on the survival rate of the rescues.

The sanctuary aims to rehabilitate all rescued pups and has an impressive record. Between 1981 and 2013 only four seals have been considered as unlikely to be able to survive in the wild. They have joined the full-time residents at the sanctuary. The long term residents are seals unable to survive in the wild due to health reasons or just because they have been in captivity too long. Some of the residents share a pool with the rescue pups. They help at feeding times by demonstrating to the pups the best way to compete for their food.

Some of the other animals in the sanctuary are California sea lion (Zalophus californianus), southern sea lion (Otaria flavescens), Humboldt penguin (Spheniscus humboldti), Asian short-clawed otter (Amblonyx cinereus), Grey seal (Halichoerus grypus) and common seal (Phoca vitulina).

See also

 List of topics related to Cornwall

References

External links
 
 British Divers Marine Life Rescue website

1975 establishments in England
Seal sanctuaries
Tourist attractions in Cornwall
Wildlife sanctuaries of the United Kingdom